Torch Lake is a lake in the Northern Lower Peninsula of the U.S. state of Michigan.

Surrounding it are several townships including Torch Lake, Central Lake, Forest Home, Helena, and Milton in Antrim County, and Clearwater Township of neighboring Kalkaska County. Several villages and hamlets lie along its shore, including Alden, Eastport, Clam River, Torch Lake, and Torch River. It is a popular lake for fishing, featuring lake trout, rock bass, yellow perch, smallmouth bass, muskellunge, pike, ciscoes, brown trout, steelhead, rainbow trout, atlantic salmon and whitefish.

History 
Torch Lake was originally formed at the end of the Last Glacial Period, along with neighboring Lake Michigan. Receding glaciers carved the surface of the Earth, and melting glaciers filled the new basins, which are now known as the Great Lakes. Torch Lake (along with other long lakes in the region like Lake Leelanau and Elk Lake) were originally bays of the young Lake Michigan. However, sandbars formed at the northern end of these lakes, separating them from Lake Michigan.

The name of the lake is not due to its shape, rather, is derived from translation from the Ojibwe name waaswaaganing meaning "Place of Torches" or "Place of Flames", referring to the practice of the local Native American population who once used torches at night to attract fish for harvesting with spears and nets (Lac du Flambeau in Wisconsin is named after the same Ojibwa term).  For a time, it was referred to by local European settlers as "Torch Light Lake", which eventually was shortened to its current name.

Geography 
Torch Lake is part of a watershed that begins in northern Antrim County with Six Mile Lake, which is connected by the Intermediate River with Lake Bellaire. The Grass River flows from Lake Bellaire into Clam Lake, which in turn drains into Torch Lake via the short Clam River. Torch Lake itself is drained by the Torch River, which flows into Lake Skegemog, which opens into Elk Lake. Elk Lake flows into the east arm of Grand Traverse Bay at Elk Rapids. This watershed is popularly known as the Chain of Lakes.

The lake itself is entirely within Antrim County. However, the southern shore of the lake serves as part of the actual border between Antrim and Kalkaska counties. The lake is located about 17 miles northeast of Traverse City.

Activities 
The lake is known for nature activities including hiking, canoeing, fishing and diving. Owing to the low amount of boat activity, it is a nature-lovers paradise. Noted for its exceptional beauty; its waters are unusually clear and exhibit a bright turquoise hue, often resembling Caribbean waters.  This quality has made the lake a popular spot for the development of resorts and second homes with notables including Kid Rock, Eminem, and Michael Moore owning vacation homes on the lake.
 
At the south end of the lake is a sandbar, locally known as the Torch Lake Sandbar. This sandbar is a popular summer tourist destination, especially around the Fourth of July. The popular location has been considered controversial by locals, due to boat traffic, and, in 2021, a COVID-19 outbreak among the Fourth of July partygoers.

See also
List of lakes in Michigan

References

External links

  
 Watershed Center Grand Traverse Bay

Lakes of Antrim County, Michigan
Lakes of Kalkaska County, Michigan
Lakes of Michigan